Daniyar Maratovich Yeleussinov (born 13 March 1991) is a Kazakh professional boxer. As an amateur he competed at the 2012 and 2016 Olympics, winning a gold medal in 2016. He also won gold medals at the 2010 and 2014 Asian Games; the 2013 World Championships; and silver at the 2015 World Championships.

Amateur career

Yeleussinov began boxing in 1999 and is trained by his father Marat Yeleussinov. Yeleussinov kickstarted his career with gold in the 2010 Asian Games, and enjoyed a remarkable 2013 when he triumphed in both the AIBA World Championships and the Asian Championships. Twice named the AIBA Elite Men’s Boxer of the Year, he takes inspiration from legendary figures including Serik Konakbayev, Bekzat Sattarkhanov, Oscar De La Hoya and Sugar Ray Leonard, and enjoys playing football, hockey and table tennis in his spare time.

Going into the 2016 Olympics, the captain of the Kazakhstan Boxing Team was the favorite to win his division, and proved his worth by winning all of his bouts via dominant 3-0 decisions including a win over undefeated top British prospect, Josh Kelly in the 2nd round.

His style has been compared to Vasyl Lomachenko and Floyd Mayweather Jr. as he has outstanding hand and foot speed, he works off angles, has an impeccable defense and has tremendous power in both hands. Yeleussinov has continued his country's domination in one of boxing’s glamour divisions as he is the 4th straight Kazakhstan boxer to win gold in the welterweight division, and he is the first of those Olympic champions to turn professional.  “When I was coming up, I looked up to the welterweights who won gold medals before me. Bakhtiyar Artayev, Bakhyt Sarsekbayev, and Serik Sapiyev were my idols,” said Yeleussinov. “I know if they ever turned professional, all three of them would have been world champion, as well as pound for pound one of the best. By signing with my management team, I know they will lead me to the pros properly, and give me the opportunity to show that Kazakhstan not only produces the best welterweights in the amateurs but also the best welterweights in the professional ranks!”

World Amateur Championships results 

2011 (as a light welterweight)
Defeated Josh Taylor (Scotland) 11–15
Defeated Masatsugu Kawachi (Japan) 14–4
Lost to Gyula Káté (Hungary) 11–17

2013 (as a welterweight)
Defeated Carl Hield (Bahamas) 3–0
Defeated Souleymane Cissokho (France) 3–0
Defeated Vincenzo Mangiacapre (Italy) 3–0
Defeated Arajik Marutjan (Germany) 3–0
Defeated Arisnoidys Despaigne (Cuba) 3–0

2015 (as a welterweight)
Defeated Pavel Kastramin (Belarus) 3–0
Defeated Eumir Marcial (Philippines) 3–0
Defeated Parviz Baghirov (Azerbaijan) 3–0
Lost to Mohammed Rabii (Morocco) 3–0

Olympic Games results 

2012 (as a light welterweight)
Defeated Jamel Herring (USA) 19–9
Defeated Mehdi Tolouti (Iran) 19–10
Lost to Vincenzo Mangiacapre (Italy) 12–16
2016 (as a welterweight)
Defeated Josh Kelly (Great Britain) 3–0
Defeated Gabriel Maestre (Venezuela) 3–0
Defeated Souleymane Cissokho (France) 3–0
Defeated Shakhram Giyasov (Uzbekistan) 3–0

Professional career
In March 2018, Yeleussinov signed a professional contract with Eddie Hearn’s Matchroom Sport and became the first Kazakh to join the stable. He made his professional debut on 28 April 2018, scoring a third-round technical knockout (TKO) over Noah Kidd at the Barclays Center in New York.

Professional boxing record

References

External links

 
 
 
 

Living people
1991 births
Olympic boxers of Kazakhstan
Boxers at the 2012 Summer Olympics
Boxers at the 2016 Summer Olympics
Asian Games medalists in boxing
Boxers at the 2010 Asian Games
Boxers at the 2014 Asian Games
World boxing champions
Kazakhstani male boxers
AIBA World Boxing Championships medalists
Medalists at the 2016 Summer Olympics
Olympic gold medalists for Kazakhstan
Olympic medalists in boxing
People from West Kazakhstan Region
Asian Games gold medalists for Kazakhstan
Medalists at the 2010 Asian Games
Medalists at the 2014 Asian Games
Welterweight boxers